FC Jūrmala was a Latvian football club from Jūrmala, founded in 2008. They last played in the Latvian First League. The home ground was Sloka Stadium in Jūrmala with capacity of 5,000 people. Until 2015, FC Jūrmala was one of two teams representing the city in the top tier and using this stadium. The last manager of the team was Andrei Kanchelskis.

History 

The club was founded in 2008 as a participant of the second tier of Latvian football. Having spent the first three seasons there, years 2008, 2009 and 2010 respectively, the club managed to achieve its best result in 2010. Following the 13th position in 2008 and the 4th position in 2009, the following year Jūrmala finished the championship in the second position. They were automatically promoted to the top tier of Latvian football. The following season in the Latvian Higher League was unexpectedly successful, as they took up the 5th position in the league table. 

In 2012 and 2013 Jūrmala found itself in the middle of the table, taking the 6th position. In 2014 the club finished the league in the 10th position, followed by economic problems and sanctions from the Latvian Football Federation due to long-term debts and unpaid wages. In the end, FC Jūrmala ended up last in the league table and was relegated to the Latvian First League.

The financial problems of the club were not solved and the team did not apply for a First League licence. Ultimately, the club asked to be expelled from the Latvian Football Federation on 31 March 2015 and folded.

League and Cup history

Managers 

 Andrejs Karpovs (2008–10)
 Andrejs Kolidzejs (caretaker) (2010–11)
 Soferbi Yeshugov (April 1, 2011 – Aug 25, 2011)
 Igors V. Stepanovs (2011–12)
 Vladimir Pachko (2012–13)
 Mihails Koņevs (2013 – May 2014)
 Gosho Iordanov Petkov (May 2014 – August 2014)
 Andrei Kanchelskis (August 2014 – November 2014)

Sponsors

Players and staff

Current squad 

As of 9 February 2015

For recent transfers see: List of Latvian football transfers summer 2014 and List of Latvian football transfers winter 2014-15

Foreign players 
Non-EU Nationals

EU Nationals
 Tauno Mõttus

Staff

References

External links 
  
Latvian Football Federation website 

 
Jurmala
Jūrmala
Jurmala
2008 establishments in Latvia

2015 disestablishments in Latvia
Association football clubs disestablished in 2015